is Japanese singer-songwriter Ua's eighth single, released on October 22, 1997. It served as theme song for the TBS TV drama "Fukigen na Kajitsu" starring Yuriko Ishida. "Kanashimi Johnny" debuted at number 11 on the Oricon Weekly Singles Chart with 60,740 units sold, becoming Ua's highest debut. Its b-side "Amefuri Hiades" was used in UCC Ueshima Coffee's Super 2 commercials.

Track listing

CD

Vinyl

Charts, certifications and sales

References

External links
 SPEEDSTAR RECORDS | UA 「悲しみジョニー」

1997 singles
Ua (singer) songs
Japanese television drama theme songs
1997 songs